Yeo Cheow Tong (born 22 June 1947) is a former Singaporean politician. A member of the governing People's Action Party (PAP), he served in the Cabinet from 1990 to 2006, and was a Member of Parliament (MP) of Hong Kah SMC from 12 December 1984 to 17 August 1988 and MP of Hong Kah GRC from 24 August 1988 to 19 April 2011 for almost 27 years.

Early life
Yeo was educated at Anglo-Chinese School, before receiving a Colombo Plan Scholarship in 1967 to study at the University of Western Australia, where he received a  Bachelor of Engineering (Mechanical) degree.

Career
He worked for Singapore's Economic Development Board (EDB) from 1972 to 1975, before entering the private sector. He entered politics in 1984. At the 1984 general election, Yeo was elected a Member of Parliament for Hong Kah constituency. In 1985, he was appointed a Minister of State at the Ministry of Health and Ministry of Foreign Affairs.

In 1988, Yeo became the Acting Minister for Health, before becoming a full member of the Cabinet in 1990. He went on to hold a number of different Cabinet positions including Minister of Health (1990–94, 1997–99), Minister for Community Development (1991–94), Minister for Trade and Industry (1994–97), Minister for the Environment (1997–99), Minister for Communications and Information Technology (1999–2001), and Minister for Transport (2001–06).

In June 2006, Yeo resigned from the Cabinet to return to the private sector. He continued to serve as a Member of Parliament for the Hong Kah Group Representation Constituency until 2011, when he retired from politics. He was succeeded by Alex Yam in the 2011 Singaporean general election.

Personal life
Yeo is married to lawyer Helen Yeo-Tan Cheng Hoong. The couple have three children and 6 grandchildren.

References

External links
Appointments of the Cabinet of Singapore
CV of Yeo Cheow Tong

Members of the Parliament of Singapore
People's Action Party politicians
Members of the Cabinet of Singapore
Anglo-Chinese School alumni
Singaporean people of Teochew descent
1947 births
Living people
Ministers for Transport of Singapore
Ministers for Health of Singapore
Communications ministers of Singapore
Ministers for Trade and Industry of Singapore
University of Western Australia alumni